The Hermann Trophy is awarded annually by the Missouri Athletic Club to the United States's top male and female college soccer players. In 1967, Bob Hermann, the president of the National Professional Soccer League (NPSL) and the Chairman of the Executive Committee of the NPSL's successor, the North American Soccer League, established a trophy to annually recognize the top men's collegiate soccer player.  The trophy, named the Hermann Trophy, has been awarded each year since 1967.  In 1988, a second Hermann Trophy was inaugurated to recognize the top women's collegiate player of the year. In 1986, the Missouri Athletic Club (MAC) began naming an annual player of the year as a rival to the Hermann Trophy.  Then in 1996, the National Soccer Coaches Association of America (NSCAA) initiated its own annual player of the year award.  These three competing awards began merging three years later when the NSCAA and MAC agreed to cooperate on naming a combined collegiate player of the year.  Finally, beginning in 2002, the MAC/NSCAA and Hermann Trophy organization merged to create a unified trophy for the top college soccer player of the year. The original Hermann Award Trophy is on display in the Hermann Atrium located in the McDonnell Athletic Center at MICDS in Ladue, Missouri.  The original trophy was donated to the school by Hermann in 2003.

Key

List of Hermann Trophy winners

Trophies won by school 
This is a list of the colleges and universities who have had a men's college soccer player win a Hermann trophy. Twenty-three different schools have produced a Hermann Trophy recipient.

References

External links 

Hermann Trophy